Messier 80 (also known as M80 or NGC 6093) is a globular cluster in the constellation Scorpius. It was discovered by Charles Messier in 1781, being one of his first discoveries.

This star cluster is, as to its angle from the solar system, midway between α Scorpii (Antares) and β Scorpii in a field in the Milky Way Galaxy that is rich in nebulæ. With low levels of light pollution it can be viewed below the 67th parallel north with modest amateur telescopes, appearing as a mottled ball of light.

It has an apparent angular diameter of about 10 arcminutes. It contains several hundred thousand stars, and ranks among the densest globular clusters in the Milky Way. It is at more than twice the distance of the Galactic Center in regions considered the Galactic halo.

It hosts relatively many blue stragglers, stars that appear to be much younger than the cluster. It is thought these have lost part of their outer layers due to close encounters with other cluster members or perhaps from collisions between stars in the dense cluster. Images from the Hubble Space Telescope have shown pronounced districts of these stragglers in M80, suggesting the center of the cluster to have a very high capture and collision rate.

On May 21, 1860, a nova was found in M80 that delivered a magnitude of +7.0 to telescopes, binoculars and astute eyes. This variable star, given designation T Scorpii, reached an absolute magnitude of −8.5, briefly outshining the cluster.

Gallery

See also
 List of Messier objects

References

External links
 
 Messier 80, SEDS Messier pages
 Messier 80, Galactic Globular Clusters Database page
 
 Messier 80 at ESA/Hubble
 

Messier 080
Messier 080
080
Messier 080
Astronomical objects discovered in 1781